Briarfield Academy is a non-sectarian, private school admitting pre-Kindergarten through twelfth grade students. It is located on Riddle Lane in Lake Providence in East Carroll Parish in northeastern Louisiana.  The school has more than 250 students.

History
The school was founded as a segregation academy in 1970 after a federal court ordered the racial integration of East Carroll Parish public schools. This was 16 years after the US Supreme Court had ruled that segregated public schools were unconstitutional, in Brown v. Board of Education (1954).

When it first opened, the school enrolled 400 students in kindergarten through 8th grade. By the end of 1970, Briarfield Academy enrolled 565 students at two campuses. Many of the Briarfield Academy's teachers in the early years were former employees of the public schools system. They resigned and took pay cuts to avoid having to teach in racially integrated classrooms.

Athletics

Championships
Football championships
(3) LISA Football: 1979, 1989, 1991

References

Private high schools in Louisiana
Private middle schools in Louisiana
Private elementary schools in Louisiana
Schools in East Carroll Parish, Louisiana
Segregation academies in Louisiana